James Crichton, known as the Admirable Crichton (19 August 1560 – 3 July 1582), was a Scottish polymath noted for his extraordinary accomplishments in languages, the arts, and sciences before he was murdered at the age of 21.

Early life
James Crichton was from Clunie, in Perthshire, although some sources maintain his birthplace was Dumfries. He was the son of Robert Crichton of Eliok, Lord Advocate of Scotland, and Elizabeth Stewart, from whose line James could claim Royal descent.

One of the most gifted individuals of the 16th century, Crichton was educated at St Andrews University between the ages of ten and fourteen, during which time he completed requirements for both his bachelor's and master's degrees. James was taught by the celebrated Scottish scholar, politician and poet George Buchanan (1506–1582). It was apparent from his earliest days that James was an unusually gifted prodigy, which may have been associated with a gift for perfect recall.

Further education in France
By the age of twenty, he was not only fluent in, but could discourse in (both prose and verse) no fewer than twelve languages, as well as being an accomplished horseman, fencer, singer, musician, orator, and debater. Noted for his good looks as well as his refined social graces, he was considered to have come closest to the ideal of the complete man.

Leaving Scotland, Crichton travelled to Paris, where he continued his education at the Collège de Navarre. It was in the French capital that he first came to prominence by challenging French professors to ask him any question on any science or liberal arts subject in Arabic, Dutch, English, French, Greek, Hebrew, Italian, Latin, Slavonic, Spanish, or Syriac. It is said that throughout the course of one extremely long day, French scholars failed to stump Crichton on any question they threw at him, no matter how abstruse.

Travel to Italy
Thereafter he spent two years as a soldier in the French army before travelling to Italy in 1579, winning acclaim in Genoa, Venice, and Padua by repeating his exploit of challenging Italian scholars to intellectual discourse and debate. Once, he is alleged to have bested a professional gladiator in a brutal fencing match.

In Venice in 1580, Crichton befriended the printer Aldus Manutius, who introduced him to the Venetian intellectual community, where the young Scot made an enormous impression on humanist scholars. In Padua in 1581, he clashed with a number of scholars over their interpretation of Aristotle, while demonstrating that their mathematics was flawed.

Perhaps tiring of intellectual duels, the following year Crichton entered the service of the Duke of Mantua, and may have become tutor to the Duke's headstrong son Vincenzo Gonzaga (although some sources suggest that Crichton served only as a member of the ducal council, and did not actually teach the prince).

Death in Mantua
What is beyond dispute is that while Crichton was in the Duke's employ, Vincenzo Gonzaga became hugely jealous of him, probably from a combination of his father's strong regard for the young prodigy as well as Crichton replacing Vincenzo as the lover of the prince's former mistress.

On the night of 3 July 1582, after leaving this lady's dwelling in Mantua, Crichton was attacked in the street by a gang of masked ruffians. He bested all but one with his sword, until the last man removed his mask to reveal the group's ringleader, Vincenzo Gonzaga himself. Tradition holds that, on seeing Vincenzo, Crichton instantly dropped to one knee and presented his sword, hilt first, to the prince, his master's son. Vincenzo took the blade and with it stabbed Crichton cruelly through the heart, killing him instantly. James Crichton of Cluny was then in his twenty-second year.

Reputation
Much of Crichton's posthumous reputation comes from a romantic 1652 account of his life written by Sir Thomas Urquhart (1611–1660), contained within an unclassifiable work (The Jewel) that is characterized by exaggeration and hyperbole. There is little or no contemporary evidence for many of the stories surrounding him.

That said, his existence is supported by a few letters and his actual abilities were probably impressive, enough that his story has not been lost through the centuries since his death. Samuel Johnson devoted the August 14, 1753 issue of the  periodical, The Adventurer, to the story of Crichton, writing, ""Among the favourites of nature that have from time to time appeared in the world, enriched with various endowments and contrarieties of excellence, none seems to have been [more] exalted above the common rate of humanity, than the man known about two centuries ago by the appellation of the Admirable Crichton." A historical novel entitled Crichton was published by the English writer William Harrison Ainsworth in 1836. "The Admirable Crichton" is referred to by Charles Dickens in his 1859 story collection The Haunted House. The "Admirable Crichton" was mentioned as an exemplar in W. M. Thackeray's Vanity Fair (1847) and referenced in chapter 3 of Anthony Trollope's The Prime Minister (1876). James Crichton's sobriquet was later employed by fellow Scot Sir James Barrie as the title of his 1902 satirical play, The Admirable Crichton, about a butler whose savoir-faire far exceeds that of his aristocratic employers. A memorial to Crichton can be found in the church of St. Bride's in Sanquhar and in the church of San Simone in Mantua.

He is also the namesake of the James Crichton Society at St Andrews University which publishes a monthly academic journal.

References

Attribution

Further reading

1560 births
1582 deaths
Alumni of the University of St Andrews
University of Paris alumni
People from Dumfries
People from Dumfries and Galloway
People from Perth and Kinross
Scottish linguists
Scottish male fencers
Scottish soldiers
Scottish murder victims
Scottish mathematicians
Scottish scientists
Kingdom of Scotland expatriates in France